Line 23 may refer to:
Line 23 (São Paulo Metro)
Line 23 (Shanghai Metro)
In Widescreen signaling, a signal is encoded in line 23 for PAL and SECAM systems